Martín Ignacio Soria (born 15 December 1975) is an Argentine lawyer and politician, currently serving as a Minister of Justice and Human Rights of Argentina, since 29 March 2021. Having previously served as a member of the Argentine Chamber of Deputies elected in Río Negro Province, Soria was designated to succeed Marcela Losardo following her resignation.

Soria previously served as intendente (mayor) of his hometown of General Roca from 2011 to 2019, succeeding his father Carlos Soria and preceding his sister, María Emilia Soria. He belongs to the Justicialist Party.

References

External links

Official website of the Ministry of Justice and Human Rights (in Spanish)
@SoriaEnAccion on Twitter

1975 births
Living people
21st-century Argentine lawyers
Justicialist Party politicians
Mayors of General Roca, Río Negro
Members of the Argentine Chamber of Deputies elected in Río Negro
Ministers of Justice of Argentina
People from General Roca
University of Buenos Aires alumni